Dismal Euphony was a metal band from Norway that mixed styles including gothic metal, black metal and classical music.

History 
The history of Dismal Euphony began in 1992 in Stavanger, Norway by bassist Ole K. Helgesen and drummer Kristoffer Vold Austrheim under the name The Headless Children, a cover band of Slayer and Kreator. A year later singer Erik Borgen and guitarist Kenneth Bergsagel joined the group.

They changed the name to Carnal Tomb, then Borgen left the band and Helgesen became the singer/bassist with the female voice of Linn Achre Tveit (Keltziva). Elin Overskott joined the band as a keyboard player.

This was the first line-up of Dismal Euphony, officially formed in 1995. In the same year, the group composed the demo Spellbound. After this publication, they were signed by Napalm Records. Here they produced other albums like Soria Moria slott, Autumn Leaves: The Rebellion of Tides and the Lady Ablaze EP (which already features Anja Natasha as female singer).

Later, Dismal Euphony joined Nuclear Blast and released All Little Devils, with the new female singer Anja Natasha.

Their last album is Python Zero. After this release the band split up.

Band members

Last known line-up 
Ole Helgesen – bass, vocals
Kristoffer Austrheim – drums
Frode Clausen – guitars
Svenn-Aksel Henriksen – keyboards
Anja Natasha – vocals

Former members 
Dag Achre Tveit – bass
Kris Vold – guitars, bass, electronics
Kenneth Bergsagel – guitars
Elin Overskott – keyboards (1994–1998)
Erik Borgen – vocals (1994)
Linn Achre Tveit – vocals (1994–1998)

Discography 
 Spellbound (demo, 1995)
 Dismal Euphony (EP, 1996)
 Soria Moria slott (1996)
 Autumn Leaves: The Rebellion of Tides (1997)
 All Little Devils (1999)
 Lady Ablaze (EP, 2000)
 Lady Ablaze (video/VHS, 2000)
 Python Zero (2001)

Norwegian black metal musical groups
Norwegian gothic metal musical groups
Musical groups established in 1995
1995 establishments in Norway
Musical groups disestablished in 2001
2001 disestablishments in Norway
Musical quintets
Musical groups from Stavanger